The Talgar is a river in Almaty Region, Kazakhstan.

The Talgar flows by Talgar, the administrative center of Talgar District.

Course
The Talgar river originates at the confluence of rivers Left Talgar and Right Talgar, which have their sources in a glacier area of the Trans-Ili Alatau range, part of the Tian Shan. It flows northwards through a valley with steep slopes. About midway down its course, it descends into a floodplain. Since 1970 the river has had its mouth in the southern lakeshore of the Kapchagay Reservoir.

The Talgar is a river seasonally prone to floods. A string of small dams has been built in its last stretch, along with a network of irrigation channels.

See also
List of rivers of Kazakhstan

References

External links

The Great Silk Road in Central and Eastern Kazakhstan

Rivers of Kazakhstan
Ili basin
Almaty Region